The Metro SubwayLink is a rapid transit line serving the greater area of Baltimore, Maryland, in the United States, and is operated by the Maryland Transit Administration. The segment in Downtown Baltimore is underground, and most of the line outside the central city is elevated or at surface grade.

History 
The origins of the Metro Subway lie in the Baltimore Area Mass Transportation Plan, published in 1965, which envisioned six rapid transit lines radiating out from a central city loop.

As the vision was translated into reality, the original concept was trimmed to a  system in the Phase 1 plan, published in 1971. This plan involved two of the original six lines: a northwest line from Downtown Baltimore to Owings Mills and a south line to Glen Burnie and the airport. Phase 1 was approved for funding by the Maryland General Assembly in 1972. In response to crime concerns of Anne Arundel County residents, the MTA eliminated the south line from Phase 1 plans in 1975.

When the Baltimore Metro Subway opened on November 21, 1983, only the "Northwest" line of the 1965 plan had come to fruition. This  segment provided service between Charles Center in Downtown Baltimore and Reisterstown Plaza in the northwest section of the city. On July 20, 1987, a  addition extended the line from Reisterstown Road Plaza to Owings Mills in Baltimore County, much of it running in the median of I-795.

Once the project was completed in 1995, the total cost for the Metro Subway was $1.392 billion.

When the system started operation, it became the largest single user of Susan B. Anthony dollar coins.

On February 11, 2018, the MTA announced a month-long closure of the entire system to complete emergency track repairs identified during a safety inspection. An aboveground portion of the system had already been shut down due to emergency inspections and repairs. The system reopened on March 9, 2018.

Farebox recovery is only 28%. This is comparable to other similarly sized systems in the continental United States, although low for international standards.

The installation of underground cellular service in the Baltimore Metro subway tunnels began in September 2021 and is expected to be complete by June 2022.

Route 
The Metro Subway has a single line that is shaped like a reverse "J". Trains head south underground from Johns Hopkins Hospital, turn west as they pass under Baltimore's central business district, then north and ultimately northwest towards Owings Mills. The route leaves its tunnel northwest of Mondawmin station, entering an elevated structure that parallels Wabash Avenue and the Hanover Subdivision. These tracks used to be part of the Western Maryland Railroad route. The route eventually leaves the older railroad right of way to enter the I-795 median, which it occupies all the way to the system's Owings Mills terminus.

Trains heading for Johns Hopkins Hospital are referred to as "eastbound" trains, while trains heading towards Owings Mills are said to be "westbound".

Schedules 
A trip from one end of the line to the other takes about half an hour. Headways range from 8 minutes during daytime peak to 11 minutes late at night and on weekends. Trains run from 5 a.m. to midnight on weekdays, 6 a.m. to midnight on weekends.

Fares 

These are the current fare prices for MTA buses, Light Rail, and Metro Subway travel.

 Note: People who qualify for paratransit services can use Metro Subway free of charge.

Connecting services 
Most Metro Subway stations are served by a number of MTA bus routes. In 1984, just months after Metro first started operating, many feeder routes were created that were given the designation of a letter (M, P, or R) followed by a number. In 1987, many of these routes were renamed, and only the prefix "M" was used. Over the years, the number of M-lines had shrunk, as many of the routes were consolidated. In 2008, routes that were designated with the letter "M" were renamed to plain two-digit designations. Finally, on August 30, 2009, the last four were either renumbered or eliminated, with no routing changes made; they continue to act as feeder routes to the Metro Subway.

There is no direct connection to the Baltimore Light Rail or to MARC. However, the Metro Subway's Lexington Market Station is a  walk from the Light Rail stop of the same name and the State Center Station is about 1.5 blocks away from Light Rail's Cultural Center. In addition, MARC Penn Station is about a one-half mile walk from State Center, and MARC Camden Station is about five blocks from Lexington Market.

Stations 

Source:

Performance 
For fiscal year 2010, the MTA reported 95% on-time performance for the system. It averaged 3.0 passenger trips per revenue mile, with a total of 13.4 million passenger trips for the year. Vehicles operated at an average cost of $11.59 per revenue mile. Local buses, in comparison, performed at a cost of $13.57 per revenue mile.

Rolling stock 

The line currently uses 100 cars manufactured by the Budd Company at their Red Lion plant in Northeast Philadelphia. Most were delivered in 1983 with a supplementary set of essentially identical cars being purchased in 1986 for the line expansion. The cars, marketed by Budd as the Universal Transit Vehicle, are identical to those formerly used on the Miami Metrorail because the two agencies built their systems at the same time and saved money by sharing a single order.

Trains draw power from the electric third rail. Cars are semi-permanently attached in married pairs and joined up to form 4-car trains, which is the normal train length. Each car can hold up to 166 passengers (76 seated, 90 standing).

The fleet had a significant overhaul between 2002 and 2005. Seats were reupholstered, and the floors were replaced. External destination rollsigns were replaced with LED displays; internal systems that display train destinations and upcoming stop announcements were also installed.

In July 2017, the MTA announced the purchase of 78 new railcars to replace the entire subway fleet. The cars will be built in Florida by Hitachi Rail Italy, formerly AnsaldoBreda, and will be similar in appearance to those purchased for the Miami Metrorail. The railcars are set to be delivered in 2023.

See also 
 List of metro systems
 List of United States rapid transit systems by ridership
 Light RailLink

References

External links 

 
 
 

 
Rapid transit in Maryland
Maryland Transit Administration
Underground rapid transit in the United States
Transportation at Johns Hopkins Hospital
Electric railways in Maryland
1983 establishments in Maryland
700 V DC railway electrification
Railway lines opened in 1983
Standard gauge railways in the United States
Railway lines in highway medians